Ciarán (Irish spelling) or Ciaran (Scottish Gaelic spelling) is a  traditionally male given name of Irish origin. It means "little dark one" or "little dark-haired one", produced by appending a diminutive suffix to ciar ("black", "dark"). It is the masculine version of the name Ciara.

The name became common in reference to Ciar, son of Fergus mac Róich, who gave his name to the Ciarraige and County Kerry, and two early Irish saints both counted among the Twelve Apostles of Ireland: Ciarán the Elder and Ciarán the Younger.

It is anglicised in various ways: Ciaran, Kieran, Keiran, Keiron, Keiren, Keerun, Kiran, etc.

The name can also be found in the Irish surname of O'Keiran, meaning "descendant of Ciarán".

Notable people

 Ciarán Bairéad (1905–1976), Irish folklorist and scholar
 Ciarán Bourke (1935–1988), Irish musician
 Ciarán Brennan (born 1956), Irish musician
 Ciarán Byrne (born 1994), Irish Australian rules footballer
 Ciarán Cannon (born 1965), Irish politician
 Ciarán Carey (born 1970), Irish hurling player
 Ciaran Carson (1948–2019), Northern Irish poet and playwright 
 Ciaran Clark (born 1989), Irish footballer
 Ciarán Cuffe (born 1963), Irish politician
 Ciaran Donnelly (born 1984), English footballer
 Ciarán Farrell (born 1969), Irish composer
 Ciaran Fitzgerald (born 1952), Irish rugby player and coach
 Ciarán Griffiths (born 1983), English actor
 Ciaran Gultnieks (born 1970), English computer/video game programmer
 Ciarán Hinds (born 1953), Irish actor
 Ciarán Hope, Fulbright Scholar and Irish composer of orchestral, choral, and film music
 Ciaran Jeremiah, British keyboardist
 Ciaran Joyce (born 1987), Welsh actor
 Ciarán Kilkenny (born 1993), Irish Gaelic footballer
 Ciarán Kelly (footballer, born 1980)
 Ciaran Kelly (footballer, born 1998)
 Ciarán Kenny (born 1984), Irish hurler
 Ciarán Lenehan (born 1990), Irish Gaelic footballer
 Ciarán Lynch (born 1964), Irish politician
 Ciarán Lyng (born 1985), Irish Gaelic footballer
 Ciarán MacGillivray (born 1987), member of Cape Breton musical group "The Cottars"
 Ciarán Mac Mathúna (1925–2009), Irish broadcaster and music expert
 Ciaran Madden (born 1942), English actress
 Ciarán Martyn (born 1980), Irish footballer
 Ciarán McDonald (born 1975), Irish Gaelic footballer
 Ciarán McKeown (1943–2019), Northern Irish peace activist
 Ciarán McMenamin (born 1975), Northern Irish actor 
 Ciarán Murphy (born 1940), Irish politician
 Ciaran O'Brien (born 1987), American soccer player
 Ciarán O Gealbháin, Irish singer
 Ciarán O'Keeffe (born 1971), English parapsychologist
 Ciaran O'Leary (born 1973), Irish professional poker player
 Ciarán Power (born 1976), Irish cyclist
 Ciarán Sheehan (born 1990), Irish Australian rules footballer
 Ciarán Sheehan, Irish actor
 Ciarán Walsh, Irish artist
 Ciarán Whelan (born 1976), Irish Gaelic footballer

Saints
 Saint Ciarán Saighir or Ciarán the Elder
 Saint Ciarán of Clonmacnoise or Ciarán the Younger
 Saint Ciarán of Dissert-Kieran, celebrated 14 June
 Saint Ciarán of Clonsost, commemorated 30 April
 Saint Ciarán mac Colga, celebrated 19 May 
 Saint Ciarán Mac Eochaidh of Tubrid, a protogé of Saint Declan

People with the given name Keiren

 Keiren Westwood (born 1984), English-Irish footballer

People with the given name Kieran

 Kieran Bell (born 1990), English musician
 Kieran Brennan (born 1957), Irish hurler
 Kieran Charnock (born 1984), English footballer
 Kieran Conry (born 1951), Bishop of Arundel and Brighton
 Kieran Culkin (born 1982), American actor
 Kieran Doherty (1955–1981), Provisional Irish Republican Army hunger striker
 Kieran Doherty, Northern Irish writer, TV format creator and Executive Producer
 Kieran Donaghy (born 1983), Irish Gaelic footballer
 Kieran Donnelly, Irish Gaelic footballer
 Kieran Dover (born 1996), Australian soccer player
 Kieran Egan (born 1942), Irish-Anglo-Canadian educationist
 Kieran Foran (born 1990), New Zealand rugby league player
 Kieran Gibbs (born 1989), English footballer
 Kieran Phelan (1949–2010), Irish Politician
 Kieran Goss (born 1962), Irish musician
 Kieran Hanrahan (born 1957), Irish musician and broadcaster
 Kieran Hebden (born 1977), English musician
 Kieran Kane (born 1949), American country singer
 Kieran Lalor (born 1976), American politician
 Kieran Lyons (born 1989), Fiji's top female chess player
 Kieran Mahon, British musician
 Kieran McAnespie (born 1979), Scottish footballer
 Kieran McFeely, Irish musician
 Kieran McGeeney (born 1971), Irish Gaelic footballer and coach
 Kieran McKeever (born 1968), Irish dual player
 Kieran Mulroney (born 1965), American actor and screenwriter
 Kieran Noema-Barnett (born 1987), New Zealand cricketer
 Kieran Nugent (1958–2000), Provisional Irish Republican Army (PIRA) member 
 Kieran O'Brien (born 1973), English actor
 Kieran O'Connor (1979–2020), Irish Gaelic footballer
 Kieran O'Donnell (born 1963), Irish politician
 Kieran Phelan (1949–2010), Irish politician
 Sir Kieran Prendergast (born 1942), English diplomat and former United Nations officer
 Kieran Prendiville (born 1947), English television writer, producer, and presenter
 Kieran Read (born 1985), New Zealand rugby union player
 Kieran Richardson (born 1984), English footballer
 Kieran Scott (born 1974), female American author
 Kieran Suckling (born 1964), Conservationist
 Kieran Tierney (born 1997), Scottish footballer
 Kieran Trippier (born 1990), English footballer
 Kieran West (born 1977), Olympic gold medal-winning rower
 Kieran White (died 1995), English singer

People with the given name Kieren

 Kieren Fallon (born 1965), six-time British Champion Jockey
 Kieren Jack (born 1987), Australian rules footballer
 Kieren Perkins (born 1973), Australian swimmer and Olympic gold medallist
 Kieren Webster (born 1986), Scottish musician

People with the given name Kieron

 Kieron Dawson (born 1975), Irish rugby union player
 Kieron Dwyer (born 1967), American comic book artist
 Kieron Dyer (born 1978), English footballer
 Kieron Gillen (born 1975), English computer games and music journalist, as well as a comic book author
 Kieron Moore (1924–2007), Irish actor
 Kieron Pollard (born 1987), West Indies cricketer
 Kieron Richardson (born 1986), English actor

People with the given name Kyran

Kyran Bracken (born 1971), Irish rugby union player
Kyran O'Donnell (born 1958), Australian politician

Fictional characters
 Ciaran McCarthy, a character from the British soap opera, Coronation Street
 King Ciaran of Venallis, one of the main characters in the Song of Souls trilogy by Christen Stovall.
 Lord's Blade Ciaran, from the video game Dark Souls
 Kieran, from The Dark Artifices by Cassandra Clare, a Wild Hunter and Mark Blackthorn's boyfriend
 Kieran is the son of Lord Donnán, who appears in the seventh episode of psychological horror adventure game, The Last Door
 Lena Kieran Luthor, a character from the CW  series  Supergirl, played by  Katie McGrath 
 Kieran Northrup, the main character of the novel, Black-Haired Boy
Kieran, a playable character in “Fire Emblem-Path of Radiance” and “Fire Emblem-Radiant Dawn”
Ciaran, a mysterious character in "1899" by Netflix.

Other cultures
 Similarly pronounced/written names exist in other cultures. Hindu religion in India has the names Kiran and Kiron (pronunciation: ki-RUN) - both mean "Ray of Light". In North India, this name is used for both boys and girls, but in South India only for boys.
 Cioran is Romanian surname, neither common nor unheard. Its most famous user was nihilist philosopher Emil Cioran.

See also
 List of Irish-language given names
 Cian Ciaran (born 1976), Welsh keyboard player
 Ciara (given name)
 Errigal Ciarán, Irish Gaelic Athletic Association club
 Chiron (disambiguation)
 Kyron (given name)
 Kira (given name)
 Keeran (disambiguation)
 Kiran (disambiguation), an Indian name
 Kirin (disambiguation), Asian name

References

English masculine given names
Irish-language masculine given names
Scottish masculine given names
Masculine given names